The Centre de services scolaire de Montréal (CSSDM, "5 Montreal school district of 15") is one of three French-language school service centres located in Montreal, Quebec, Canada, appointed by the Ministry of Education.

The CSSDM operates 129 elementary schools, 37 secondary schools, 13 adult education centres, and 9 vocational training centres and 28 schooling service centres.

History 
On June 15, 2020, it replaced the former elected Commission scolaire de Montréal (Montreal school commission or school board), which was created on July 1, 1998, as a result of a law passed by the Quebec government that changed the school board system from denominational to linguistic. Its main predecessor is the Montreal Catholic School Commission (Commission des écoles catholiques de Montréal or CÉCM) which was composed of both French and English Roman Catholic schools and had been in operation for over 150 years.

In January 2021, the Quebec government announced that it had ordered an inquiry into the CSSDM.

List of schools

Elementary schools 

 École Barclay
École Bedford
 École Champlain
 École Des Cinq-Continents
 École Des Nations
 École du Petit-Chapiteau
 École Élan 
École FACE (Also a High School)
 École Félix-Leclerc
 École François de Laval et annexe
 École Garneau
 École Iona
 École Jean-Baptiste-Meilleur
 École Lanaudière
 École Laurier
 École Le Plateau
 École Les-Enfants-Du-Monde
 École Louis-Hippolyte-Lafontaine
 École Lucille-Teasdale
 École Marc-Favreau
 École Marguerite-Bourgeoys
 École Marie-Favery
 École Notre-Dame-des-Neiges
 École Philipe-Labarre
 École Saint-Anselme
 École Saint-Enfant-Jésus
 École Saint-Louis-de-Gonzague
 École Saint-Pascal-Baylon
 École Saint-Pierre-Claver
 École Simonne-Monet
 École Maisonneuve
 École Baril
 École Saint-Bernardin
 École Saint-Nom-de-Jésus
 École Saint-François-d’Assise
 École Saint-Barthélemy (Pavillon des Érables et pavillon Sagard 
 École Internationale de Montréal (primaire)
 École internationale la Vérendry

High schools
Académie Dunton
Académie de Roberval
École Chomedey-De Maisonneuve
École de la Lancée
École de la Source
École Édouard-Montpetit
École Espace-Jeunesse
École secondaire Eulalie-Durocher
École Eurêka
École Évangeline (EVLA - 2e cycle du secondaire)
École FACE
École Georges-Vanier
École Honoré-Mercier
École internationale de Montréal
École Irénée-Lussier
École Jeanne-Mance
École Joseph-Charbonneau
École secondaire Joseph-François-Perrault
École La Dauversière (EVLA - 1er cycle du secondaire)
École le Tremplin
École le Vitrail
École La Voie
École Louis-Joseph-Papineau
École Louis-Riel
École Louise-Trichet
École Lucien-Pagé
École secondaire Marguerite-De Lajemmerais
École secondaire Marie-Anne

École Rosalie-Jetté
École Robert-Gravel
École Saint-Henri
École Saint-Louis
École Saint-Luc
 École Sophie-Barat

References

External links

  Centre de services scolaire de Montréal 

School districts in Quebec
Education in Montreal